Marius Stan may refer to:
Marius Stan (scientist) (born 1961), Romanian scientist and actor
Marius Stan (politician) (born 1957), a Romanian former footballer turned politician